North Platte is a city in and the county seat of Lincoln County, Nebraska, United States. It is located in the west-central part of the state, along Interstate 80, at the confluence of the North and South Platte Rivers forming the Platte River. The population was 23,390 at the 2020 census.

North Platte is a railroad town; Union Pacific Railroad's large Bailey Yard is located within the city. Today, North Platte is served only by freight trains, but during World War II the city was known for the North Platte Canteen, a volunteer organization serving food to millions of traveling soldiers. 

North Platte is the principal city of the North Platte Micropolitan Statistical Area, which includes Lincoln, Logan, and McPherson counties.

History

North Platte was established in 1866 when the Union Pacific Railroad was extended to that point. It derives its name from the North Platte River.

North Platte was the western terminus of the Union Pacific Railway from the summer of 1867 until the next section to Laramie, Wyoming, was opened the following summer. Even though Congress had authorized the building of the Transcontinental Railroad in 1862, it had been extended only as far as Nebraska City by the start of the summer of 1867. The  section from Nebraska City to North Platte was completed in less than six weeks.

In the 1880s, Buffalo Bill Cody established his ranch, known as Scout's Rest Ranch, just north of town. It is now a National Historic Landmark.

On July 13, 1929, a black man shot and killed a white police officer. The black man reportedly took his own life, being trapped by a mob. This led to the formation of white mobs combing the city, and ordering black residents to leave North Platte. Fearing mob violence, most of North Platte's black residents fled.

The North Platte Canteen was one of the largest volunteer efforts of World War II, originating in 1941. Tens of thousands of volunteers from North Platte and surrounding towns met the troop trains passing through North Platte, offering coffee, sandwiches, dessert, and hospitality to nearly seven million servicemen.

Geography

Climate
The average window for freezing temperatures is September 30 thru May 13, allowing a growing season of 139 days.

Demographics

2010 census
As of the census of 2010, there were 24,733 people, 10,560 households, and 6,290 families residing in the city. The racial makeup of the city was 93.1% White, 1.0% African American, 0.7% Native American, 0.7% Asian, 2.8% from other races, and 1.7% from two or more races. Hispanic or Latino of any race were 8.8% of the population.

There were 10,560 households, of which 30.4% had children under the age of 18 living with them, 44.5% were married couples living together, 10.7% had a female householder with no husband present, 4.3% had a male householder with no wife present, and 40.4% were non-families. 34.8% of all households were made up of individuals, and 13.9% had someone living alone who was 65 years of age or older. The average household size was 2.29 and the average family size was 2.95.

The median age in the city was 37.1 years. 24.9% of residents were under the age of 18; 9% were between the ages of 18 and 24; 25% were from 25 to 44; 25.6% were from 45 to 64; and 15.5% were 65 years of age or older. The gender makeup of the city was 48.8% male and 51.2% female.

2000 census
As of the census of 2000, there were 23,878 people, 9,944 households, and 6,224 families residing in the city. The population density was 2,281.5 people per square mile (880.5/km2). There were 10,718 housing units at an average density of 1,024.1 per square mile (395.2/km2). The racial makeup of the city was 93.47% White, 0.71% African American, 0.64% Native American, 0.39% Asian, 0.03% Pacific Islander, 3.30% from other races, and 1.45% from two or more races. Hispanic or Latino of any race were 6.68% of the population.

There were 9,944 households, out of which 31.0% had children under the age of 18 living with them, 49.8% were married couples living together, 9.6% had a female householder with no husband present, and 37.4% were non-families. 31.9% of all households were made up of individuals, and 13.0% had someone living alone who was 65 years of age or older. The average household size was 2.34 and the average family size was 2.97.

In the city, the population was spread out, with 26.0% under the age of 18, 9.5% from 18 to 24, 26.8% from 25 to 44, 21.9% from 45 to 64, and 15.8% who were 65 years of age or older. The median age was 36 years. For every 100 females, there were 94.5 males. For every 100 females age 18 and over, there were 90.0 males.

As of 2000 the median income for a household in the city was $34,181, and the median income for a family was $42,753. Males had a median income of $36,445 versus $20,157 for females. The per capita income for the city was $18,306. About 7.8% of families and 10.5% of the population were below the poverty line, including 13.2% of those under age 18 and 9.8% of those age 65 or over.

Arts and culture
Lincoln County Historical Museum contains a display detailing the history of the North Platte Canteen. It also contains a Prairie Village with local landmark homes and other buildings, including a Pony Express station and pioneer church among many others.

Buffalo Bill Ranch State Historical Park is located near North Platte, a Nebraska living history park about "Buffalo Bill" Cody. The park includes his actual house known as Scout's Rest Ranch. The park is two miles west of U.S. Highway 83 along U.S. Highway 30.

Every June, North Platte hosts the annual "Nebraskaland Days". The event includes parades, art shows, rodeos, concerts, and food events. It draws over 100,000 attendees every year.

North Platte is host to the annual Miss Nebraska pageant, an official preliminary for the Miss America Organization.

Infrastructure

Transportation
North Platte is home to the world's largest rail yard, Bailey Yard. The Golden Spike Tower and Visitor Center is an eight-story building which overlooks the expansive classification yard and engine facilities. The tower and visitor center are open to the public year-round. Passenger train service was discontinued in 1971.

North Platte is home to North Platte Regional Airport. United Express serves the airport with twice-daily service to Denver International Airport. There is also a door-to-door bus system available for residents of the town.

Media

Notable people

 Chris Başak, baseball infielder was born in North Platte. He played in the New York Mets, Minnesota Twins and New York Yankees organizations. He made five appearances in the major leagues in 2007 with the Yankees, going 0-for-1.
 Howard Baskerville, American teacher in the Presbyterian mission school in Tabriz, Iran; born in North Platte. He was killed defending the Constitutional Revolution of Iran and known as "American Martyr of the Constitutional Revolution."
 Buffalo Bill Cody, iconic Wild West showman, owned a ranch in North Platte.
 Nathan Enderle, football quarterback, selected by the Chicago Bears in the fifth round of the 2011 NFL Draft; born in North Platte and attended North Platte High School.
 Paul Faulkner (1913–1997), artist; born in North Platte.
 Chuck Hagel, Nebraska U.S. Senator and U.S. Secretary of Defense; born in North Platte.
 Bill Hayes, baseball player, lived in North Platte and attended Saint Patrick's High School.
 Henry Hill (1943–2012), New York City mobster; worked as a cook in North Platte.
 John Howell, former American football safety in the National Football League, played for the Tampa Bay Buccaneers and Seattle Seahawks; born in North Platte.
 Glenn Miller, popular big band leader; lived in North Platte for one year during his early childhood.
 Keith Neville, 18th governor of Nebraska; born in North Platte.
 Joe Ragland (born 1989), American-Liberian basketball player for Hapoel Holon of the Israeli Basketball Premier League
 Red Cloud, Sioux warrior; born near North Platte in 1822.
 Dr. Don Rose, San Francisco Bay Area disc jockey; born and raised in North Platte and frequently referred to the city on his morning show.
 Ryan Schultz, professional mixed martial artist, Lightweight Champion of defunct IFL; raised in North Platte.
Zane Smith, professional baseball player, was a two-sport athlete for North Platte 1978-79, before spending 13 years in major league baseball.
 Danny Woodhead, retired NFL running back; born in North Platte and attended North Platte High School.

See also
 National Register of Historic Places in Lincoln County, Nebraska

Explanatory notes

References

Further reading

External links

 City of North Platte
 North Platte Area Chamber of Commerce
 North Platte Lincoln County Convention and Visitors Bureau

 
Cities in Lincoln County, Nebraska
Cities in Nebraska
North Platte Micropolitan Statistical Area
County seats in Nebraska
1868 establishments in Nebraska